Jermareo Davidson (born November 15, 1984) is an American former professional basketball player. He played college basketball for the University of Alabama.

High school

Jermareo Davidson attended Wheeler High School in Marietta, Ga.

College

Jermareo Davidson attended The University of Alabama from 2003–2007.

Professional

Davidson was named to the NBA 2007 Summer League All-Pro Second Team along with teammate Jared Dudley.

On July 26, 2007, Davidson was signed to a two-year deal by the Charlotte Bobcats.

On October 27, 2008, he was released by the Bobcats.

On January 5, 2009, he was signed to a 10-day contract with the Golden State Warriors. DeMarcus Nelson was waived to make room for Davidson. Prior to the signing, Davidson was with the NBA Development League's Idaho Stampede, with whom he was averaging 16.1 points and 10.8 rebounds in 15 games.

On January 15, he was signed to a second 10-day contract and on January 25, he was signed for the rest of the season.

On June 30, the Warriors announced that he would play for their 2009 NBA Summer League team in Las Vegas

After putting up disappointing numbers in the 2009 NBA Summer League, the Warriors waived Davidson on July 27, 2009.

He signed a contract with the Turkish Basketball League team Darüşşafaka Cooper Tires on October 1, 2009 and lead the Turkish league in rebounding that season averaging 15.9 points and 10.7 rebounds.

On May 16, 2010, he signed a contract in Puerto Rico with Caciques de Humacao from the Baloncesto Superior Nacional (BSN) league.

In August 2011 he signed a one-year deal with Skyliners Frankfurt in Germany.

On December 6, 2012, Davidson signed with Antalya Büyükşehir Belediyesi of Turkey. On February 27, 2013, he parted ways with Antalya.

On November 3, 2014, Davidson signed with Al-Ittihad Jeddah of Saudi Arabia.

Awards
2006 AP All-SEC Second Team

Career statistics

NBA seasons 

|-
| align="left" | 2007–08
| align="left" | Charlotte
| 38 || 2 || 8.5 || .408 || .000 || .643 || 1.6 || .3 || .2 || .4 || 3.2
|-
| align="left" | 2008–09
| align="left" | Golden State
| 14 || 0 || 7.9 || .486 || .000 || .471 || 2.4 || .1 || .1 || .2 || 3.0
|-
| align="left" | Career
| align="left" | 
| 52 || 2 || 8.3 || .425 || .000 || .578 || 1.8 || .3 || .2 || .3 || 3.1

Domestic leagues

Notes

External links

NBA Draft profile
ESPN profile
News and Discussion on Jermareo Davidson's career with the Charlotte Bobcats
Playing Through The Pain
TBLStat.net Profile

1984 births
Living people
African-American basketball players
Alabama Crimson Tide men's basketball players
American expatriate basketball people in Germany
American expatriate basketball people in Qatar
American expatriate basketball people in Russia
American expatriate basketball people in Turkey
Antalya Büyükşehir Belediyesi players
Basketball players from Atlanta
Basketball players from Marietta, Georgia
BC Krasnye Krylia players
Caciques de Humacao players
Charlotte Bobcats players
Darüşşafaka Basketbol players
Golden State Warriors draft picks
Golden State Warriors players
Idaho Stampede players
Power forwards (basketball)
Sioux Falls Skyforce players
Skyliners Frankfurt players
American men's basketball players
21st-century African-American sportspeople
20th-century African-American people